Thomas Stalker Butler (November 4, 1855 – May 26, 1928) was an American politician who served as a U.S. Representative from Pennsylvania from March 4, 1897 until his death, having been elected to the House sixteen times. He was the father of the Marine Corps Major General Smedley Butler. He was Dean of the United States House of Representatives.

Early life 
Butler was born in Uwchlan Township, Chester County, Pennsylvania. His father was Samuel Butler, a farmer and banker who served in the Pennsylvania House of Representatives and one term as Pennsylvania State Treasurer from 1880 to 1882. Thomas attended the common schools, West Chester State Normal School, and Wyer’s Academy in West Chester.

He later studied law, was admitted to the bar in 1877, and commenced practice in West Chester. From 1885 to 1889 and again in 1927-1928 he served as trustee of the West Chester State Normal School. Butler was appointed judge of the fifteenth judicial district of Pennsylvania in 1888.

Political career 
Butler stood as an unsuccessful candidate for reelection in 1889. He was a delegate to the Republican National Convention in 1892.

Elected to Congress in his first term as an Independent Republican, he was elected as a Republican for each succeeding term. While in Congress, he was chairman of the United States House Committee on Pacific Railroads (Fifty-ninth through Sixty-first Congresses) and member of the United States House Committee on Naval Affairs (Sixty-sixth through Seventieth Congresses).

During World War I, Butler read into the Congressional Record the "bogus oath", which was falsely attributed to the Roman Catholic fraternal organization Knights of Columbus, in which the oath taker pledges to war against Protestant Christians. The bogus oath was refuted by the Committee on Public Information, the wartime information agency of the Woodrow Wilson administration.

Butler died in office and was buried in Oaklands Cemetery, West Chester, Pennsylvania.  His home at West Chester, The Butler House, was listed on the National Register of Historic Places in 1980.

See also
List of United States Congress members who died in office (1900–49)

References

West, Michael Allen. Laying the Legislative Foundation: The House Naval Affairs Committee and the Construction of the Treaty Navy, 1926-1934. Ph.D. dissertation, Ohio State University, 1980.

External links

Thomas S. Butler at The Political Graveyerd

American Quakers
1855 births
1928 deaths
Burials at Oaklands Cemetery
Pennsylvania state court judges
Pennsylvania Independents
Independent Republican members of the United States House of Representatives
Republican Party members of the United States House of Representatives from Pennsylvania
People from West Chester, Pennsylvania
Deans of the United States House of Representatives